The Sierra Mágina is a massif mostly in the province of Jaén (southern Spain), part of the Cordillera Subbética. The highest peak is the Pico Mágina, with an elevation of 2,164 m.

Geography
The boundaries of the massif are grossly defined by the Guadalquivir valley from the north, the Guardiana Menor from east, and Guadahortuna from south and the Guadalbullón from south.

Protected area
Most of the chain is included in a natural park, the Parque Natural de Sierra Mágina.

The range can be reached from Albanchez de Mágina, Bedmar, Belmez de la Moraleda, Cambil, Huelma, Jimena, Jódar, Mancha Real, Pegalajar or Torres

See also
Baetic System
Sierra Mágina Comarca

References

External links 

Jaén - Parque Natural de Sierra Mágina
 DO Sierra Mágina

Magina
Mountain ranges of Andalusia